Dean Hadley (born 5 August 1992) is an English professional rugby league footballer who plays as a  and  for Hull Kingston Rovers in the Betfred Super League and the England Knights at international level. 

He has played for Hull F.C. in the Super League, and spent time on loan from Hull at the York City Knights in the Championship, Doncaster in League 1, and Wakefield Trinity and Hull Kingston Rovers in the Super League.

Background
Hadley was born in Kingston upon Hull, East Riding of Yorkshire, England.

Career
Hadley began his career with Hull F.C., coming through their academy and signing his first professional contract before the start of the 2013.

He was loaned to York City Knights, and made 10 appearances for the club, scoring 4 tries. He also played twice in the Super League in April for Hull F.C. due to injuries occurring in the first team.

For the 2014 season, he was loaned to Doncaster. He played just 3 games before being recalled to play in the first team for Hull FC. Since then, he has made 8 appearances for the club and could be finally cementing his place in the starting 13. Dean has scored 2 tries for the club, one of them against the Huddersfield Giants in a 30-6 victory.

On 29 July 2019, Hadley joined rivals Hull Kingston Rovers from Hull F.C. on a three year deal, teammate Jez Litten also joined the red and whites on a three year deal.

International career
In July 2018 he was selected in the England Knights Performance squad. Later that year he was selected for the England Knights on their tour of Papua New Guinea. He played against Papua New Guinea at the Lae Football Stadium.

References

External links
Hull KR profile
Hull FC profile
SL profile

1992 births
Living people
Doncaster R.L.F.C. players
English rugby league players
England Knights national rugby league team players
Hull F.C. players
Hull Kingston Rovers players
Rugby league second-rows
Rugby league players from Kingston upon Hull
Wakefield Trinity players
York City Knights players